Belite Orli Stadium is a multi-use stadium in Pleven, Bulgaria.  It is currently used mostly for football matches and is the home ground of the Bulgarian football team PFC Belite Orli Pleven. The stadium holds 22,000 people. 

Pleven Stadium
Buildings and structures in Pleven
Pleven